Dear Rosie (1990) is a 1990 British short subject directed by Peter Cattaneo from a script by Peter Morgan and Mark Wadlow. The plot follows Rosie, played by Fiona Victory, an unsuccessful novelist who begins receiving letters from overweight people after her agent publishes her diet tips.

Cattaneo directed the short while he was a student at the Royal College of Art. The 11-minute film premiered at the 1990 London Film Festival. The following year, it was presented at the New York Film Festival.

The short was nominated in the Best Short Film category at the 44th British Academy Film Awards, and the Short Film (Live Action) category at the 63rd Academy Awards.

References

External links 

 on Vimeo

1990 films
Films directed by Peter Cattaneo
Films with screenplays by Peter Morgan
British short films
Channel 4 television dramas
1990 short films
1990s English-language films